The following is a list of 83 of the 89 federal subjects of Russia in order of population according to the 2010 and 2021 Russian Census. The totals of all federal subjects do not include nationals living abroad at the time of census.

Most recent estimates

a.  excluding Nenets Autonomous Okrug.

Ranked list according to census

 Data excludes Khanty–Mansi and Yamalo-Nenets Autonomous Okrugs.

 Data excludes Nenets Autonomous Okrug.

Population history
Demographic evolution for the federal subjects and federal districts of Russia:

See also
 List of federal subjects of Russia by area
 List of cities and towns in Russia by population
 List of federal subjects of Russia by life expectancy

Notes

R